Intair was a Canada-based airline that operated between 1989 and 1991.

History 
Intair operated passenger jet service between Toronto and Montreal with Fokker 100 aircraft as well as scheduled jet and turboprop passenger service to other destinations in eastern Canada and also charter flights between Canada and such vacation destinations as Orlando and Ft.Lauderdale in Florida. According to the Official Airline Guide (OAG), in late 1989 Intair was operating up to twelve nonstop flights a day between Montreal Dorval Airport (YUL) and Toronto Pearson Airport (YYZ) primarily with the Fokker 100 twin jet and was also operating F100 jet service nonstop between Montreal and Quebec City, Rouyn-Noranda, Saguenay and Val-d'Or in Quebec province, and nonstop between Montreal and Moncton in New Brunswick province as well.

The airline began operations after Nordair was purchased by Canadian Pacific Airlines.  Intair used Nordair's IATA two letter "ND" airline code. The airline was established in 1989 by City Express as a successor to Skycraft Air Transport.  It served many destinations in Quebec province formerly served by Quebecair and also flew to destinations in New Brunswick, Newfoundland and Labrador, and Ontario provinces of Canada.

Fleet 

 Fokker 100 x 6 - only jet aircraft type operated by the airline
 ATR 42 turboprop x 6
 Fairchild Swearingen SA-226 Metro II turboprop (multiple aircraft) one was C-GQAL which was delivered to Propair and crashed as Flight 420 in 1998

Destinations in 1990 
According to a 1990 Intair route map brochure, the airline was serving the following destinations in these Canadian provinces:

New Brunswick

 Charlo
 Chatham
 Moncton

Newfoundland and Labrador

 Wabush/Labrador City

Ontario

 Ottawa
 Toronto - Toronto Pearson International Airport

Quebec

 Alma
 Baie-Comeau
 Baie-Johan-Beetz
 Blanc-Sablon
 Bonaventure
 Chibougamau
 Dolbeau
 Gaspe
 Gatineau/Hull
 Gethsemanie/La Romaine
 Harrington Harbour/Chevery
 Havre-St.-Pierre
 Iles-de-la-Madeleine
 Kegaska
 La Grande
 La Tabatiere
 Montreal - Dorval Airport (now Montreal-Pierre Elliot Trudeau International Airport) - Hub
 Montreal - Mirabel Airport
 Montreal/St.-Hubert 
 Natashquan
 Port Menier
 Quebec City - Hub
 Roberval
 Rimouski/Mont-Joli
 Rouyn/Noranda
 Saguenay
 Schefferville/Bagotville
 St.-Augustin
 Sept-Iles - Secondary hub
 Tete-a-La-Baleine
 Val-d'Or

See also 
 List of defunct airlines of Canada

References

External links 

Intair at Planespotters.net

Airlines established in 1989
Defunct airlines of Canada
Airlines disestablished in 1991
Transport in Peterborough, Ontario
Companies based in Mississauga